Olga San Juan (March 16, 1927January 3, 2009) was an American actress and comedian. Born in Brooklyn, she began her brief film career with Paramount Pictures after being scouted at Copacabana. She performed in several Hollywood musicals in the 1940s and on Broadway in Paint Your Wagon (1951).

Early years
Olga San Juan was born on March 16, 1927, in Flatbush, Brooklyn, New York, to Puerto Rican parents. Her family went to Puerto Rico when she was three and then returned to New York City two years later, moving to East Harlem. Her singing career reportedly began when she performed with a group of schoolchildren from New York at the White House for President Franklin Delano Roosevelt. She left high school in ninth grade after her father became ill, performing at venues including El Morocco and the Hotel Astor.

Career
San Juan was contracted to Paramount Pictures in 1943 after being scouted at Copacabana and performing at the Paramount Theatre. In Blue Skies (1946), San Juan performs a dance to "Heat Wave" with Bing Crosby. She was especially keen to be cast as Amber La Vonne in Variety Girl (1947). In Variety Girl, a film about the film world, Amber La Vonne is desperate to make it in Hollywood; critics Charles Higham and Joel Greenberg call the film's "funniest scene" one in which San Juan's character causes a commotion in a restaurant just to be seen by the glitterati.

In the 1940s, San Juan mainly appeared in musicals as "a Latina entertainer or love interest". She was nicknamed the "Puerto Rican Pepper Pot", ostensibly "for her vivacious and spicy personality". Her last Hollywood film came out in 1949. According to critic Boze Hadleigh (writing under the pseudonym George Hadley-Garcia), San Juan's departure from film was driven by a shift in the public's musical preferences and by the end of World War II, which caused the Good Neighbor policy to wane.

In 1951, San Juan starred on Broadway in the Lerner and Loewe musical, Paint Your Wagon. She played Jennifer Rumson, a woman who finds gold and gets rich during the California Gold Rush.

Personal life
San Juan was married to actor Edmond O'Brien. They had met at a publicity luncheon for Fox studios, and married on September 26, 1948, in Santa Barbara, California. They had three children including television producer and actor Brendan O'Brien. O'Brien and San Juan divorced in 1976.

San Juan's health began to fail after a stroke in the 1970s. She died of kidney failure on January 3, 2009, at Providence St. Joseph Medical Center in Burbank, California. She was buried at San Fernando Mission Cemetery in Mission Hills, Los Angeles.

Awards
 Donaldson Award for her work in Paint Your Wagon
 Screen Actors Guild Latino Legacy Award

Filmography

Notes

Sources

Further reading

External links
 
 
 

1927 births
2009 deaths
20th-century American actresses
20th-century American singers
20th-century American women singers
Actresses from New York City
American film actresses
American musical theatre actresses
American people of Puerto Rican descent
Burials at San Fernando Mission Cemetery
Donaldson Award winners
Deaths from kidney failure
Musicians from Brooklyn